Axe Creek is a small community outside of Bendigo in central Victoria, Australia. It is located in the City of Greater Bendigo local government area.  The McIvor Highway passes through to the north of Axe Creek.

Axe Creek is named after a nearby creek of the same name. Most residents visit Bendigo for access to amenities. There is no commercial area.

References

Towns in Victoria (Australia)
Bendigo
Suburbs of Bendigo